Gustavo Enrique Vassallo Ferrari (born September 6, 1978 in Chiclayo) is a Peruvian footballer who plays as a forward.

Club career
He has played for Sporting Cristal, Sport Boys, Universitario de Deportes, Cienciano del Cuzco and Juan Aurich.

International career
Vassallo has made five appearances for the Peru national football team.

Honours

Club
Sporting Cristal
 Torneo Clausura: 1998

Country
Peru national team
 Kirin Cup (1): 2005

References

External links
 
 
 

1978 births
Living people
People from Lambayeque Region
Association football forwards
Peruvian footballers
Peru international footballers
Sporting Cristal footballers
Juan Aurich footballers
OGC Nice players
K.A.A. Gent players
Palermo F.C. players
Sport Boys footballers
Club Universitario de Deportes footballers
Cienciano footballers
C.S. Emelec footballers
Sport Áncash footballers
Deportivo Universidad San Marcos footballers
Peruvian Primera División players
Ligue 2 players
Serie B players
Belgian Pro League players
Segunda División B players
Peruvian Segunda División players
Peruvian expatriate footballers
Expatriate footballers in France
Expatriate footballers in Belgium
Expatriate footballers in Spain
Expatriate footballers in Italy
Expatriate footballers in Ecuador
RSD Alcalá players